"Be My Girl" is a song  performed by American R&B group The Dramatics, issued as the second single from their seventh studio album Joy Ride. The song peaked at #53 on the Billboard Hot 100 in 1976., and was a Top 10 national Billboard R&B hit, peaking at # 3.

Chart positions

References

External links
 
 

1976 songs
1976 singles
ABC Records singles
The Dramatics songs
Song recordings produced by Michael Henderson
Songs written by Michael Henderson